This is a list of railway stations in Essex, a county in the East of England. It includes all railway stations that are part of the National Rail network, and which currently have timetabled train services. The Central line of the London Underground and Heritage railway stations within Essex are not listed.

Rail operators
The main operator in the county is Greater Anglia, operated by Abellio and Mitsui. They operate services from Liverpool Street in London to all parts of the county, including commuter services within Essex, and longer distance services to Norwich and Peterborough. Greater Anglia also operate the Stansted Express service from London to Stansted Airport. The other major operators in Essex are c2c, a subsidiary of Trenitalia, who operate services from London's Fenchurch Street to Southend-on-Sea, and TfL Rail, operated by MTR Corporation for Transport for London, who operate services from London's Liverpool Street to Shenfield, which in the future will form part of the Crossrail route. The Arriva subsidiary CrossCountry operate long-distance services from the West Midlands to Stansted Airport. CrossCountry also serve Audley End.

Stations
The following table lists the name of each station, along with (where known) the year it first opened and the local authority in whose area the station lies. The table also shows the train operators who currently serve each station, and the final two columns give information on the number of passengers using each station in recent years, as collated by the Office of Rail Regulation, a Government body. The figures are based on ticket sales, and are given to the nearest 100.

See also
 List of London Underground stations
 Closed London Underground stations
 List of railway stations in Kent

Footnotes
 
  moved in 1869 to accommodate through running of trains to Bishops Stortford. The site of the original station became a goods yard.
 Southend Central was rebuilt in 1889, and enlarged in 1899.

References

External links 
 National Rail Enquiries

Essex

Railway stations